Ammannia crinipes is a species in the family Lythraceae that is endemic to northern Australia.

The species is found in the Kimberley region of Western Australia.

References

crinipes
Plants described in 1859
Rosids of Western Australia